Ligiarctus is a genus of tardigrades, in the subfamily Florarctinae which is part of the family Halechiniscidae. The genus was named and described by Jeanne Renaud-Mornant in 1982.

Species
The genus includes two species:
 Ligiarctus alatus Gomes-Júnior, Santos, da Rocha, Santos & Fontoura, 2017
 Ligiarctus eastwardi Renaud-Mornant, 1982

References

Publications
Renaud-Mornant, 1982 : Sous-famille et genre nouveaux de tardigrades marins (Arth(r)otardigrada). [New Subfamily and Genre of Underwater Tardigrades (Arthrotardigrada)] Bulletin from Muséum National d'Histoire Naturelle Section A Zoologie Biologie et Écologie Animales, vol. 4, no 1/2, p. 89-94.

Halechiniscidae
Tardigrade genera